The term percent for art refers to a program, often a city ordinance, where a fee, usually some percentage of the project cost, is placed on large scale development projects in order to fund and install public art.  The details of such programs vary from area to area. Percent for art programs are used to fund public art where private or specialized funding of public art is unavailable. Similar programs, such as "art in public places", attempt to achieve similar goals by requiring that public art be part of a project, yet they often allow developers to pay in-lieu fees to a public art fund as an alternative.

History

Europe 
In Finland, the percent for art principle was first introduced as an official government policy in connection with the construction of the Finnish Parliament building in the early 1930s, though it was not implemented until 1939. In 1956 the government extended the principle to all public buildings, and during the 1960s individual municipalities also drew up their own schemes. In 1981 the Association of Finnish Local and Regional Authorities, an advocate for all Finnish municipalities and regions, recommended extending the principle to all aspects of the urban environment. In 1991 the City of Helsinki became the first city to adopt the policy for all building projects, which led to a vast growth in urban art, even within suburban areas. In 2015 the Finnish Ministry of Education and Culture funded a handbook available to the sponsors of public art work under the title "The Handbook of the Percent For Art Principle in Finland", which is also published in English.

In France, one percent of the cost of all public works must be allocated to commissioning a work of art since 1951.

In Ireland, one percent of the cost of all public works can be allocated to commissioning a work of art. The scheme was introduced in 1978, and extended to all government departments in 1997. Percent for Art is also promoted for construction and infrastructure projects in Northern Ireland.

United States 
From 1934 to 1943, the Section of Painting and Sculpture in the United States Department of the Treasury followed a policy requiring one percent of the cost of federal buildings to be applied toward art and decoration.  In 1959, Philadelphia adopted the first such municipal ordinance in the United States.  Other jurisdictions followed suit, including  Baltimore in 1964, San Francisco and Hawaii in 1967, and Seattle in 1973.

More than half of the states now maintain percent-for-art programs.  On the federal level, since 1963 the General Services Administration has maintained the Art in Architecture Program, which allocates one-half of one percent of construction cost for art projects.

See also
Arts council

References

External links

Programs:

Australia
Western Australia

Canada
Toronto

United Kingdom
Bolton

United States
Chapel Hill
Chicago
Kansas City
Madison, WI
Maine
Massachusetts Institute of Technology
Minnesota
Montana
New Hampshire
New Haven
New York
Ohio
Oregon
Palm Desert
Philadelphia 
Roanoke, Virginia
San Francisco

Digital collections:

Publications:

Public art
Arts in the United States
Contemporary art